Zvi Elimelech Halberstam (born 1952) is the present Sanz Rebbe of Netanya, Israel. He is also known as the Sanzer Rebbe. He is the eldest son of Rabbi Yekusiel Yehudah Halberstam, the first Sanz-Klausenberger Rebbe, who in his will divided the leadership of the Klausenburger Hasidim between his two sons, Rabbi Zvi Elimelech and Rabbi Shmuel Dovid (the present Sanz-Klausenburger Rebbe of Brooklyn). He holds his court in the Kiryat Sanz, Netanya neighborhood founded by his father.

Biography
Halberstam was a child of his father's second marriage in 1947 to Chaya Nechama Ungar, the orphaned daughter of the Nitra Rav, Rabbi Shmuel Dovid Ungar. This marriage produced two sons — Rabbi Zvi Elimelech and Rabbi Shmuel Dovid — and five daughters.

Leadership
Upon his father's death in 1994, Rabbi Zvi Elimelech became the spiritual leader of the Sanz community in Israel. He is responsible for the Sanz Torah and chessed organizations in Netanya, Jerusalem, Bnei Brak, Petah Tikva, Haifa, Safed, Ashdod, Modiin, Beitar Illit, and Elad. and in borough park, Williamsburg, Monsey and Lakewood. He is also directly responsible for all the institutions built by his father in Israel, including Laniado Hospital, where he serves as president.

See also
Klausenberg (Hasidic dynasty)
Sanz (Hasidic dynasty)
Haredi Judaism

References

External links
Photos: Sanz-Klausenberg Grand Shabbos Sheva Brachos in Netanya Following Wedding Attended By 10,000

Rebbes of Sanz-Klausenberg
Hasidic rabbis in Israel
Living people
1952 births